Proton VPN is a VPN service operated by the Swiss company Proton AG, the company behind the email service Proton Mail. According to its official website, Proton VPN and Proton Mail share the same management team, offices, and technical resources, and are operated from Proton's headquarters in Geneva, Switzerland.

Features 
As of 4 January 2023, Proton VPN has a total of 1,904 servers, sited in 67 different nations.

Although ProtonVPN owns and operates a portion of their servers, the bulk majority are owned and operated by ASNs such as M247 and Datacamp Limited. Its service is available for Windows, MacOS, Linux, Android, and iOS, and also has a command-line tool  for Linux and can be implemented using the IPSEC protocol. Proton VPN can also be installed on a Wireless Router.

Proton VPN utilizes OpenVPN (UDP/TCP) and the IKEv2 protocol, with AES-256 encryption. The company claims to not keep logs and claims to protect users from WebRTC and DNS leaks.

In January 2020, Proton VPN released its source code on all platforms and had SEC Consult conduct an independent security audit.
In July 2021, Proton VPN added WireGuard protocol as beta version.

Reception 
In a September 2019 review by TechRadar, Proton VPN received 4 1/2 out of 5 stars.  

A February 2019 PC Magazine UK review rated Proton VPN at 4 1/2 out of 5 based on its services and price range.

See also 

 Comparison of virtual private network services
 Internet privacy
 Encryption
 Secure communication

References 

Internet privacy
Virtual private network services
Free and open-source Android software